This article lists the performances of each of the national teams which have made at least one appearance in the FIFA World Cup.

As of the 2022 FIFA World Cup, 80 national teams have competed at the final tournaments. Brazil is the only team to have appeared in all 22 tournaments to date, with Germany having participated in 20, Italy in 18, Argentina in 18 and Mexico in 17. To date, eight nations have won the tournament. The inaugural winners in 1930 were Uruguay; the current champions are Argentina. The most successful nation in the competition are currently Brazil, who have won the cup on five occasions. Five teams have appeared in FIFA World Cup finals without winning, while eleven more have appeared in semi-finals.

Ranking of teams by number of appearances

Former countries

Debut of national teams 
Each successive World Cup has had at least one team appearing for the first time. Using FIFA's view on successor teams, the total number of teams that have participated in the World Cup until the 2022 edition is 80.

Overall team records

Medal table

Comprehensive team results by tournament
The team ranking in each tournament is according to FIFA. The rankings, apart from the top four positions (top two in 1930), are not a result of direct competition between the teams; instead, teams eliminated in the same round are ranked by their full results in the tournament.

For each tournament, the number of teams in each finals tournament are shown (in parentheses).

 Legend

Hosts

Results of defending finalists
The defending World Cup champions were formerly granted an automatic spot in the Cup finals field. As of the 2006 tournament, this berth is no longer guaranteed. However, no defending World Cup champion has yet failed to qualify.
Automatic berths have never been given for defending World Cup runners-up. Defending runners-up have qualified 16 times in 19 attempts for the following World Cup.

Results by confederation

AFC

CAF

CONCACAF

CONMEBOL

OFC

UEFA

Active consecutive participations 
This is a list of active consecutive participations of national teams in the FIFA World Cup

Droughts
This section is a list of droughts associated with the participation of national football teams in the FIFA World Cups. 1942 and 1946, when the tournament was not held due to World War II, are not included in the calculation of a drought.

Longest active World Cup appearance droughts
Does not include teams that have not yet made their first appearance or teams that no longer exist.

Longest World Cup appearance droughts overall
Only includes droughts begun after a team's first appearance and until the team ceased to exist.

See also
 AFC Asian Cup records and statistics
 Africa Cup of Nations records and statistics
 Copa América records and statistics
 FIFA Beach Soccer World Cup records and statistics
 FIFA U-17 World Cup records and statistics
 FIFA U-20 World Cup records and statistics
 FIFA Confederations Cup records and statistics
 FIFA Futsal World Cup
 FIFA Women's World Cup records and statistics
 UEFA European Championship records and statistics

Footnotes

References

FIFA World Cup records and statistics

All-time football league tables